This is a list of notable magazines that promote or practice scientific skepticism.

See also 
 Humanism
 Lists about skepticism
 List of books about skepticism
 List of skeptical conferences
 List of skeptical organizations
 List of skeptical podcasts
 List of notable skeptics
 Rationalism

Notes

References 

 

Science and technology magazines
Magazines